General elections were held in Oman on 27 October 2019. A total of 637 candidates contested the elections for the 86 seats in the Consultative Assembly. Because political parties are outlawed in Oman, all candidates ran as independents.

Electoral system
The 86 members of the Consultative Assembly were elected from 25 two-member constituencies and 36 single member constituencies.

Results

References

Oman
Election
Elections in Oman
Non-partisan elections
October 2019 events in Asia
Election and referendum articles with incomplete results